Muhammad Akmal bin Nor Hasrin (born 15 July 1995) is a Malaysian professional archer. He competed in the archery competition at the 2016 Summer Olympics in Rio de Janeiro.

References

External links
 
 
 

Malaysian male archers
Living people
1995 births
Malaysian people of Malay descent
Archers at the 2016 Summer Olympics
Olympic archers of Malaysia
Sportspeople from Kuala Lumpur
Archers at the 2018 Asian Games
Asian Games competitors for Malaysia